The Saturn Award for Best Performance by a Younger Actor in a Television Series is one of the annual awards given by the American professional organization, the Academy of Science Fiction, Fantasy & Horror Films. The Saturn Awards are the oldest film-specialized awards to reward science fiction, fantasy, and horror achievements (the Hugo Award for Best Dramatic Presentation, awarded by the World Science Fiction Society who reward science fiction and fantasy in various media, is the oldest award for science fiction and fantasy films).

The category, which specifically rewards young actors and actresses in television, was first introduced at the 40th Saturn Awards in 2013 where it was won by Chandler Riggs for his role as Carl Grimes in The Walking Dead. Riggs, Brec Bassinger  and Maisie Williams are the only performers to have won twice in this category. At the 47th Saturn Awards in 2022, the category was split into Best Performance by a Younger Actor in a Network or Cable Television Series and Best Performance by a Younger Actor in a Streaming Television Series.

Winners and nominees

2010s

2020s

Multiple nominations
5 nominations
 Chandler Riggs

3 nominations
 Max Charles
 Maisie Williams

2 nominations
 KJ Apa
 Millie Bobby Brown
 Alycia Debnam-Carey
 David Mazouz

Multiple awards
3 wins
 Chandler Riggs

2 wins
 Brec Bassinger
 Maisie Williams

References

External links
 Saturn Awards official website

Younger Actor (Television)
Awards for young actors
Awards established in 2013
2013 establishments in the United States